Madho Singh (1 July 1929 – 2006) was an Indian wrestler. He competed at the 1960 Summer Olympics and the 1964 Summer Olympics.

References

External links
 

1929 births
2006 deaths
Indian male sport wrestlers
Olympic wrestlers of India
Wrestlers at the 1960 Summer Olympics
Wrestlers at the 1964 Summer Olympics
People from Hoshiarpur district